Bukit Permai is a state constituency in Johor, Malaysia, that has been represented in the Johor State Legislative Assembly.

History

Polling districts
According to the gazette issued on 30 March 2018, the Bukit Permai constituency has a total of 12 polling districts.

Representation history

Election results

References 

Johor state constituencies